Classification of the Functions of Government (COFOG) is a classification defined by the United Nations Statistics Division. These functions are designed to be general enough to apply to the government of different countries. The accounts of each country in the United Nations are presented under these categories. The value of this is that the accounts of different countries can be compared.

References

External links
 CKAN COFOG Package

Government
Classification systems